Lake Trahlyta is a reservoir in Union County, Georgia.  The lake is located in Vogel State Park near Blairsville, Georgia which is one of the first two original state parks in the state of Georgia.

The lake is named for Princess Trahlyta of the Eastern Band of Cherokees.

References

Trahlyta
Bodies of water of Union County, Georgia